Sundaresvarar Temple, Kattur is a Hindu temple dedicated to the deity Shiva, located at Kattur in Tiruvarur district, Tamil Nadu, India.

Vaippu Sthalam
It is one of the Vaippu Sthalams mentioned in songs by Tamil Saivite Nayanar Sambandar, one of the 63 Hindu saints living in Tamil Nadu during the 6th to 8th centuries CE.

Presiding deity
The presiding deity represented by the lingam is known as Sundaresvarar. His consort is known as Abirami Ammai.

Other deities
In the Prakaram, shrines of Subramania, Surya and Vinayaka are found.

Location
This temple is located at Kattur in Tiruvarur-Kumbakonam road, at a distance of 5 km from Tiruvarur.

References

Hindu temples in Tiruvarur district
Shiva temples in Tiruvarur district